The Faculty of Geology is part of the School of Sciences in National and Kapodistrian University of Athens.

Early history 
The history of the Geological Sciences at Athens University until the year 1982 and the institutional change of the law 1268, is identified with the history of the Chairs and the Professors that taught and is described further below.

Professor K. Mitsopoulos taught the lesson of Mineralogy till 1910, while in the year 1896 the Laboratory and the Museum of Mineralogy and Petrology are founded. In 1910, K. Ktenas is elected as professor for the homonymous Chair and he teaches until his death in 1935. In 1936, G. Georgalas is elected in his place and he stays in this position until 1946. After him, An. Georgiadis (1946–1965) and Gr. Marakis (1973–1994) are also elected as professors.

The Chair of Geology and Palaeontology as well as the homonymous Laboratory and Museum are founded by professor Th. Skoufos after his appointment in the chair mentioned in 1906. He enriched the Laboratory and the Museum with fossils as training material for students and as material for the collection of the museum exhibition, through many excavations realized in various places around Greece. 

After Professor Skoufos (1906–1936), Professor M. Mitsopoulos becomes Head of the Laboratory and the Museum and later on G. Marinos (1969–1974) after being called in from the Aristotle University of Thessaloniki. Professor N. Symeonidis takes over in 1975 and stays head of the Laboratory until 1998.

The Chair of Physical Geography and the corresponding laboratory is founded in 1931 and is initially located at the Athens Observatory. Professor I. Trikkalinos is head of the Laboratory until 1958. Later on P. Psarianos is elected as Professor (1959–1974) and then Ath. Papapetrou-Zamani, initially as Associate professor and then as Professor (1975–1997).

In the year 1931 the Chair of Seismology and the corresponding laboratory is founded with Professor N. Kritikos (1930–1947) as head of the Laboratory, which is initially located at the Athens Observatory. Later on A. Galanopoulos (1949–1978) and I. Drakopoulos (1979–1999) were elected.

The Chair of Ore Geology and the corresponding Laboratory are founded in 1961 and the elected Professor G. Paraskevopoulos taught until his death in 1983.

Departments 
According to the law 1268/82 the School of Sciences is founded, which also includes the Faculty of Geology. The previously mentioned Chairs were annulled and the following Departments were created and still exist to this day:

Department of Mineralogy and Petrology
Department of Historical Geology and Palaeontology
Department of Geography and Climatology
Department of Geophysics and Geothermics
Department of Economical Geology and Geochemistry
Department of Dynamic, Tectonic and Applied Geology

Laboratories 
Laboratory of Mineralogy and Petrology
Laboratory of Historical Geology and Palaeontology
Laboratory of Physical Geography
Laboratory of Climatology
Laboratory of Seismology
Laboratory of Economical Geology and Geochemistry
Laboratory of Tectonics and Geological mapping
Laboratory of Remote Sensing
Laboratory of Geophysics
Laboratory of Prevention and Management of Natural Disasters

Professors Emeriti 
Athina Papapetrou Zamani  Professor of Physical Geography
Nikolaos Simeonidis       Professor of Geology and Palaeontology
Ioannis Zampakas          Professor of Climatology
Sotirios Leontaris        Professor of Physical Geography
Ilias Mariolakos          Professor of Geology and Palaeontology
Stylianos Skounakis       Professor of Economic Geology
Nikolaos Delimpasis       Professor of Seismology
Konstantinos Sideris      Professor of Mineralogy and Petrology

Postgraduate courses 
Within the framework of the postgraduate studies program of the Faculty of Geology the following two year courses are offered:

Geochemical Environmental Pollution
Stratigraphy - Palaeontology
Mineral Sciences
Geography and Environment
Dynamic Tectonic and Applied Geology
Geophysics - Seismology
Prevention and Management of Natural Disasters

as well as the inter-faculty Postgraduate Study Program in Oceanography in which the following faculties are involved: Geology, Biology, Physics, Chemistry.

Museums 
The Faculty of Geology manages two museums
Paleontology and Geology Museum
Mineralogy and Petrology Museum

References 
Faculty of Geology Official Site

Geology education
National and Kapodistrian University of Athens